The Confederation Liberty and Independence, frequently shortened to just Confederation, is a far-right political party in Poland.

It was initially founded in 2018 as a political coalition for the 2019 European Parliament election, although it was later expanded into a political party. It won 11 seats in the Sejm after the 2019 parliamentary election. Its presidential candidate for the 2020 election was Krzysztof Bosak who placed fourth among eleven candidates. A coalition mainly led by Korwin, National Movement, and the Confederation of the Polish Crown, it is right-orientated and is considered to be a part of the radical right. It has expressed right-wing populist rhetoric, a more hardline opposition stance towards the European Union and immigration. It is economically liberal and has called for lowering taxes, and has also expressed socially conservative and nationalist stances.

History 
Two political parties, KORWiN and National Movement, announced in late 2018 that they have decided to run together in the upcoming European Parliament elections. In early 2019, Grzegorz Braun's organization and Piotr Krzysztof Liroy-Marzec's party joined the coalition. Kaja Godek, an ultra-conservative activist, announced her participation on the list. The coalition was dubbed "Pro-Polish Coalition", although in late February 2019, it was changed to "Konfederacja Korwin Braun Liroy Narodowcy". In March 2019, an application was submitted to register the party under that name, and the Federation for the Republic of Poland soon joined the alliance including some representatives. Its name was changed again, this time to "Confederation". The Party of Drivers joined the coalition in April, and soon after they elected Marek Jakubiak as the chairman. The Confederation placed fourth in the 2019 European Parliament election, winning 4.55% of the popular vote, although it did not reach the electoral threshold. After the election, Braun applied for the registration of the Confederation of the Polish Crown.

The coalition was registered on 25 July 2019 under the name "Confederation Liberty and Independence". Kaja Godek left the coalition soon after. Shortly before the 2019 parliamentary election, a schism occurred in the coalition, with many representatives joining the coalition while some of them also left. The coalition ended up winning 6.81% of the popular vote and won 11 seats in the Sejm. Most of the support the party received was in southeast and northern parts of Poland. Around 20% of all young voters aged under-30 supported the grouping, about two-thirds of its voters were male and more than three-fifths lived in smaller towns and rural areas. This has been highlighted as a significant change from previous right-wing alliances involving Korwin-Mikke where the base of support was almost exclusively young males. In November 2019, the Confederation presented nine candidates that took part in the presidential primaries organized by the party. The winner of the presidential primary was Krzysztof Bosak, who became Confederate candidate for the presidential election. During the first round of the election Bosak received 1,317,380 votes or 6.78%, coming fourth among eleven candidates.

In 2022, serious internal splits emerged as a result of Sławomir Mentzen's and Janusz Korwin-Mikke's pro-Russian and Ukrainophobic stances in light of the 2022 Russian invasion of Ukraine, causing several members to renounce their KORWiN memberships, albeit remaining within the coalition.

Ideology and position 
The Confederation is a right-orientated political party, and it is positioned on the far-right on the political spectrum. It is also considered to be a part of the radical right, although some have disputed that it does not contain all elements of the radical right.

Its ideology compromises the support for numerous right-wing populist ideas. It has presented a hardline opposition stance to the European Union, and has criticized its and Law and Justice's policies towards immigration, calling for harder stances against illegal immigration instead. It is also socially conservative, and antifeminist, it also supports total ban on abortion, and supports the traditional family model. It has also expressed xenophobic views, and has openly provided support for antisemitism. During the COVID-19 pandemic, it has also spread misinformation about COVID-19 and opposed laws that were implemented by the government.

Unlike the Law and Justice, its economic position is orientated towards economic liberalism and economic libertarianism and it is considered strongly pro-free market. It is also nationalist, and has been also described as national-liberal. In its program, they have stated their goal "to turn Poland into a ethnocracy and culturally homogenous nation built around traditionalist-Catholic principles". It has also expressed nativist sentiment.

Platform 
Confederation's platform includes the following promises, as well as others:
 Taxation
 Eliminate the income tax
 Make social insurance contributions optional
 Reduce gasoline taxes
 Reduce government spending
 Judicial
 Hire more judges' assistants
 Restore capital punishment
 Education
 Create a school voucher program
 Allow parents to opt-out their children from sex-education classes
 Create a cultural voucher that can be used on arts or museums
 National Security
 Allow licensed civilians to own firearms
 Allow the use of nuclear energy
 Oppose the European Union's refugee resettlement program
 Oppose increases in immigration
 Expect immigrants to integrate into Polish culture
 Health
 Ban importation of garbage
 Oppose the European Union's climate change rules
 Protect human life from the moment of conception
 Business
 Abolish penalties for street trade and raise the limits on unlicensed trade.
 Raise the VAT exemption to zl 400,000
 Index the tax exempt amount to be approximately twelve times the minimum wage
 Allow businesses to refuse services on moral grounds

Composition

Current political parties

Current organisations and movements

Former political parties

Political parties who had members with individual agreements

Former organisations and movements

Results

European Parliament

Sejm

Senate

Presidential

Internal

See also 
 National Movement (Poland)
 Liroy
 Grzegorz Braun
 Kukiz'15
 United Right

References

 
2018 establishments in Poland
Eurosceptic parties in Poland
Capital punishment in Poland
Climate change denial
Political parties established in 2018
Political party alliances in Poland
Right-wing populism in Poland
Anti-Islam political parties in Europe
Anti-Islam sentiment in Poland
Right-wing populist parties
Right-wing parties in Europe
Anarcho-capitalist organizations